Hi Suhyun was a South Korean duo formed by YG Entertainment in 2014, consisting of Lee Hi and Lee Su-hyun from Akdong Musician. They released the number one single, "I'm Different", in November 2014.

Discography

Singles

Awards and nominations

Seoul Music Awards

|-
| rowspan="3"| 2015
| rowspan="3"| Hi Suhyun
| Bonsang
| 
|-
| Popularity Award
| 
|-
| Hallyu Special Award
|

References

External links

K-pop music groups
South Korean musical duos
South Korean pop music groups
South Korean dance music groups
South Korean contemporary R&B musical groups
South Korean girl groups
Musical groups from Seoul
Female musical duos
Musical groups established in 2014
YG Entertainment artists
2014 establishments in South Korea
Pop music supergroups
Contemporary R&B supergroups